Kentucky Route 699 (KY 699) is a  state highway in southeastern Leslie County and southern Perry County, Kentucky, that runs from KY 80 south of Wooton to KY 7 southwest of  Cornettsville via Smilax, Cutshin, Yeaddiss, and Slemp.

Major intersections

References

0699
0699
0699